Wayne Odesnik was the defending champion but decided not to participate.
Denis Kudla won the title, defeating Érik Chvojka 5–7, 7–5, 6–1 in the final.

Seeds

Draw

Finals

Top half

Bottom half

References
 Main Draw
 Qualifying Draw

Fifth Third Bank Tennis Championships - Singles
2012 MS